Albert van Schendel (21 September 1912 in Lage Zwaluwe – 12 April 1990 in Muret, France) was a Dutch professional road bicycle racer. Albert van Schendel was the younger brother of cyclist Antoon van Schendel. He rode in the 1947 Tour de France.

Major results

1936
Bordeaux - Saintes
Derby du Nord
1937
Circuit du Gers

References

External links 

Official Tour de France results for Albert van Schendel

1912 births
1990 deaths
Dutch male cyclists
Dutch Tour de France stage winners
People from Drimmelen
Cyclists from North Brabant